Pika Peak is a mountain located between Mount Richardson and Ptarmigan Peak in Banff National Park, Alberta, Canada  The mountain was named in 1928 after the pika, the small "rock rabbit" that inhabits alpine regions.

The Lake Louise Mountain Resort is developed on the southern slopes of the Merlin Ridge, which includes Mount Richardson, Ptarmigan Peak and Pika Peak. A campground is located at the foot of the mountain, near Hidden Lake.

The first ascent was made in 1911 by L.L. Delafield and L.M. Earle, who were guided by Rudolph Aemmer and Edward Feuz jr.

Routes 
The scrambling route via the Richardson-Pika col and the west ridge is rated difficult. Either gain the col by ascending Mt. Richardson (easy scramble) or by attacking the lower flanks of Pika Peak above Hidden Lake.

See also 
 List of mountains in the Canadian Rockies

References

Three-thousanders of Alberta
Mountains of Banff National Park